Henry Foss Hall, SM (28 June 1897 – 1971) was a Canadian academic administrator. He was Dean, then Principal of Sir George Williams University from 1935 to 1962.

One of the inaugural recipients of the Order of Canada, he received the Medal of Service of the Order of Canada in 1967.

The Henry F. Hall Building at Concordia University in Montreal is named in his honour.

References 

 "Dr. Henry F Hall dies, retired SGWU head", The Montreal Gazette, September 7, 1971, p. 11
 https://www.concordia.ca/cunews/main/stories/2015/08/26/henry-f-hall-fonds-archives.html
 https://www.gg.ca/en/honours/recipients/146-2816

1897 births
1971 deaths
Recipients of the Medal of Service of the Order of Canada
Anglophone Quebec people
Academics from Quebec
Canadian university and college chief executives
Canadian academic administrators